Antonio Gómez may refer to:

 Antonio Gómez (jurist), Spanish jurist and priest
 Antonio Enríquez Gómez (c. 1601–1661), Spanish dramatist, poet and novelist
 Antonio Gómez (boxer) (born 1945), Venezuelan featherweight boxer
 Antonio Gómez Medina (born 1970), Mexican wrestler
 Antonio Gómez (footballer, born 1973), Spanish footballer
 Antonio Gómez (footballer, born 1992), Spanish footballer
 Antonio Gómez Rufo (born 1954), Spanish writer